The People's Progressive Party/Civic (PPP/C) is a democratic socialist, left-wing populist political party in Guyana. As of 2020, the party holds 33 of the 65 seats in the National Assembly and forms the government. It has been the ruling party in the past as well, most recently between 1992 and 2015. In Guyana's ethnically divided political landscape, the PPP/C is a multi-ethnic organization that is supported primarily by Indo-Guyanese people.

History 
The PPP was founded on 1 January 1950 as a merger of the British Guiana Labour Party led by Forbes Burnham and the Political Affairs Committee led by Cheddi Jagan, and was the first mass party in the country. It was initially a multi-ethnic party supported by workers and intellectuals. The party held its first congress on 1 April 1951. Its third congress was held in 1953, with Burnham unsuccessfully seeking to become party leader. The party went on to win the 1953 elections, taking 18 of the 24 elected seats in the House of Assembly, resulting in Jagan becoming Chief Minister.

However, Jagan's radical social reforms led to the British authorities sending in troops shortly after the elections, claiming there was the threat of a Marxist revolution. The PPP government was removed from office and an unelected Interim Legislative Council replaced the House of Assembly. General elections were held in 1957, by which time the PPP had split into two factions, which competed against each other at the elections; the faction led by Jagan won nine seats, whilst the Burnham-led faction won three. Following the elections, Burnham's faction left the party to establish the Afro-Guyanese-dominated People's National Congress (PNC), establishing an ethnic divide between the two parties, with the PPP left representing Indo-Guyanese. The PPP won the 1961 elections by a 1.6% margin, but received almost double the number of seats compared to the PNC, leading to serious inter-racial violence.

Convinced that Jagan was probably a Communist, the Kennedy administration used the Central Intelligence Agency and forced a reluctant United Kingdom to aid a campaign by conservatives and Burnham loyalists to evict the PPP government. Riots ensued, with the hope of ousting the Chief Minister. In the 1964 elections the PPP won the most seats, but the PNC and the United Force together won more seats, and were invited to form a government. Jagan refused to step down, and had to be removed from office by Governor Richard Luyt.

Following independence and an outright PNC victory in the 1968 elections, the political scene became increasingly polarized by ethnicity, and in early 1970 the Burnham government declared a republic organized on socialist, non-aligned principles. This action co-opted much of the PPP's programme, and the PPP eventually extended limited support to the ruling party on the basis of appeals to patriotism and national unity. The controversy over this move led to the emergence of a "third force", the Working People's Alliance (WPA) of Walter Rodney, in 1979. All three major parties drew to different extents from Marxist thought, making the racial divide even more pronounced. A series of elections in the 1970s and 1980s were rigged by the PNC, who won an increasing number of seats on each occasion.

A political opening was initiated by PNC President Desmond Hoyte in the late 1980s, and free elections were held in 1992, which resulted in a PPP/C victory and Jagan becoming president. He died in March 1997, with Sam Hinds becoming president. However, Cheddi's widow Janet Jagan was the PPP/C candidate for the presidency in the 1997 elections, which the party won, resulting in Jagan becoming the first American-born female head of state.

Jagan resigned as president in 1999 due to ill-health, and was succeeded by Bharrat Jagdeo, who led the PPP/C to victory in the 2001 elections. A major scandal erupted in 2004 when farmer George Bacchus announced that he had evidence implicating the PPP/C Minister for Home Affairs, Ronald Gajraj, in the operation of "phantom death squads" that killed up to 40 people, including the brother of George Bacchus. President Jagdeo quickly dismissed the allegations, although the PNCR continued to push for a thorough investigation. Bacchus himself was assassinated on 24 June 2004, leading to further outrage and allegations of a cover-up by the PNCR. Gajraj resigned, pending an investigation by a government commission of inquiry. The following year, Gajraj was formally exonerated by the commission, which did however say that he had an "unhealthy relationship" with organized crime.

The PPP/C went on to win the 2006 elections, before Jagdeo stepped down in 2011 to allow Donald Ramotar to run as the party's presidential candidate in the elections that year. The elections saw the PPP/C win 32 seats, A Partnership for National Unity (an alliance including the PNCR) 26 and the Alliance for Change seven. Although the opposition APNU and AFC had won a majority of seats (33), the PPP/C was able to retain power as the election rules meant that the leader of the largest single party became president. As a result, the AFC and APNU ran a combined list for the 2015 elections, which won 33 seats, allowing PNCR leader David A. Granger to become president.

Election results 
Note: elections denoted by § were considered neither free nor fair.

Guyanese Presidents from the PPP/C

References

External links 
 

1950 establishments in British Guiana
Communism in Guyana
Communist parties in South America
International Meeting of Communist and Workers Parties
Marxist parties
Political parties established in 1950
Political parties in Guyana